The T65 telephone was introduced in 1965 in the Netherlands as the standard telephone given out by the PTT (currently KPN).

References

KPN